Batillipes lusitanus is a species of tardigrade in the genus Batillipes.

Description
Batillipes lusitanus has middle toes on each four feet which are all equal in length. It exhibits a dorsal cuticular ornamentation which is constituted by large pillars, which makes the cuticle itself appear similar to that of B. adriaticus has.

References

Arthrotardigrada
Animals described in 2018